Florida's 3rd House District elects one member of the Florida House of Representatives. The district is represented by Jayer Williamson. This district is located in the Florida Panhandle, and encompasses part of the Emerald Coast, as well as parts of the Pensacola metropolitan area and the Crestview metropolitan area. The district covers the most of Santa Rosa County and the top half of Okaloosa County. The largest city in the district is Navarre. As of the 2010 Census, the district's population is 158,797.

This district has a large military presence, serving as a bedroom community for the Naval Air Station Pensacola to the west and Eglin Air Force Base to the East. The district also contains Naval Air Station Whiting Field, as well as several Naval outlying landing fields.

There was a vacancy between December 31, 2006 and February 27, 2007 as the incumbent, Holly Benson, was appointed Secretary of the Florida Department of Business and Professional Regulation by Governor-elect Charlie Crist. Gulf Breeze City Councillor Clay Ford won a special election to fill the seat.

Representatives from 1967 to the present

See also 

 Florida's 1st Senate district
 Florida's 2nd Senate district
 Florida's 1st congressional district

References 

03
Santa Rosa County, Florida
Okaloosa County, Florida